Bjarne Redestad is a retired Swedish footballer. Redestad made 63 Allsvenskan appearances for Djurgården and scored 3 goals.

References

Swedish footballers
Djurgårdens IF Fotboll players
Association footballers not categorized by position
Year of birth missing